Toto (stylized as TOTO) is an American rock band formed in 1977 in Los Angeles, California. Toto is known for a musical style that combines elements of pop, rock, soul, funk, progressive rock, hard rock, R&B, blues, and jazz. Having released 14 studio albums and sold over 40 million records worldwide, the group has received several Grammy Awards and was inducted into the Musicians Hall of Fame and Museum in 2009.

David Paich and Jeff Porcaro had played together as session musicians on several albums and decided to form a band; David Hungate, Steve Lukather, Steve Porcaro, and Bobby Kimball were recruited before the release of the band's eponymous debut album in 1978. Led by the Top 5 single "Hold the Line", the album brought the band to mainstream attention but it was their fourth album Toto IV (1982) which brought them global attention. "Africa" topped the Billboard Hot 100, while "Rosanna" reached number 2, helping Toto become one of the best-selling music groups of their era.

History

1977–1979: Formation and debut album

The members of Toto were regulars on albums by Steely Dan, Seals and Crofts, Boz Scaggs, Sonny and Cher, and many others, contributing to many of the most popular records of the 1970s. Keyboardist David Paich, son of musician and session player/arranger Marty Paich, rose to fame after having co-written much of Scaggs's Silk Degrees album. Having played on many sessions with drummer Jeff Porcaro (the son of session percussionist Joe Porcaro), whom he met while attending Grant High School, where they formed the band Rural Still Life, Paich began to discuss seriously with Porcaro the possibility of their forming their own band. They brought in bassist and fellow session veteran David Hungate, having played with him in the backing band for Scaggs. In addition, the duo asked fellow Grant High School students, guitarist Steve Lukather (who also played in Scaggs's band as a replacement for Les Dudek) and Jeff Porcaro's brother Steve Porcaro (keyboards) to join the team. Lukather and Steve Porcaro were in the same year at Grant and continued the band Rural Still Life (the name shortened to Still Life) after Paich and Jeff graduated. With the addition of former S.S. Fools singer Bobby Kimball, the group began to work on their first album in 1977 after signing with Columbia Records.

Once the band came together, David Paich began composing what would become the eponymous debut album, Toto. According to popular myth, at the first recording sessions, in order to distinguish their own demo tapes from other bands' in the studio, Jeff Porcaro wrote the word "Toto" on them. In the early 1980s, band members told the press that the band was named after Toto the dog from The Wizard of Oz. After the completion of the first album, the band and record were still unnamed. David Hungate, after viewing the name on the demo tapes, explained to the group that the Latin words "in toto" translated to "all-encompassing". Because the band members played on so many records and so many musical genres, they adopted the name "Toto" as their own..

After its release, Toto climbed the charts quickly, earning popularity with the hit single "Hold the Line", as well as the charting "I'll Supply the Love" and "Georgy Porgy", featuring Cheryl Lynn. The band garnered international acclaim and was nominated for a Grammy Award for Best New Artist. Shortly thereafter, in early 1979, Toto embarked on their first American tour in support of the debut album.
For the tour, Toto brought along two additional musicians, Tom Kelly (guitar, backup vocals) and Lenny Castro (percussion), to increase the depth of the sound. Castro had appeared with the group on their first album as a session musician, and continued to play on every one of their albums for the next 40 years in varying capacities, with the exception of Turn Back. The band continued to hire additional touring musicians for all subsequent tours. (See the "Tour Musicians" section below).

1979–1981: Hydra and Turn Back
At the close of the first tour, the band began work on their next album, titled Hydra, which was released later that year and featured the single "99", inspired by George Lucas' cult film THX 1138. Nearly 30 years later, Steve Lukather confessed that, despite the song's popularity, he hated "99" and that it's one of his least favorite Toto songs, which is why it was rarely performed after Hydras tour. The band also released four promotional music videos for the album, including the title track, "99", "St George and The Dragon" and "All Us Boys". They were directed by Bruce Gowers and produced by Paul Flattery for Jon Roseman Productions International. Although the album Hydra failed to achieve the commercial success of Toto's first release, it still went gold. Following the album's release, the band set out on the "Hydra Tour", which featured both American and international dates. The tour lasted from February until June 1980.

In early 1981, Toto released their third album, Turn Back. The album was a venture into arena rock and featured heavier guitar and fewer keyboards than the previous two albums. Its disappointing chart performance and sales in almost every country except Japan and Norway put the band's career into further jeopardy, as they had not had a hit single in North America in almost two years at that point. The abnormal success of the album's lead single "Goodbye Elenore" in Japan proved to be the band's breakthrough there, and Japan has become a permanent staple of their touring schedule since.

1982–1985: Toto IV and Isolation

1982 marked the beginning of Toto's most successful era. After the detrimental sales of Turn Back, the band was under a great deal of pressure from the record company to produce a new hit record, akin to their first. With the Triple Platinum-certified Toto IV, the band delivered one of the most commercially successful records of the year. The album featured three singles that reached the Top 10 on the Billboard Hot 100 chart: "Rosanna", "Africa" and "I Won't Hold You Back". The album also appeared on several worldwide charts, introducing the band to new audiences around the globe. "Africa" topped the charts in February 1983 and was a constant presence on radios around the world, but it was "Rosanna" that earned the band multiple Grammy nominations. Toto IV earned six Grammy Awards, including "Record of the Year" for "Rosanna", "Album of the Year" for Toto IV and "Producer of the Year". At the time Steve Porcaro was dating actress Rosanna Arquette, but the song is not about her, according to writer David Paich. In the music video for the song, Cynthia Rhodes plays the title character. In addition to "Africa" and "Rosanna", Toto IV continued its successful run with the release of another single, "Make Believe". Toto toured throughout 1982 in support of Toto IV. Also, during this time, Steve Porcaro co-wrote and co-composed "Human Nature", which Michael Jackson recorded for his best-selling album Thriller (1982), turning the song into a smash hit. Jeff Porcaro and Steve Lukather also appeared on Thriller on multiple tracks, most notably the Jackson/Paul McCartney duet "The Girl Is Mine".

Directly after the release of Toto IV, bassist David Hungate left the band. Hungate, who had relocated to Nashville in 1980 to pursue a session/production career, felt that the fame surrounding Toto IV would prevent him from spending time with his family. A third Porcaro brother, Mike Porcaro, who had performed cello on a track from Toto IV, replaced Hungate on bass, while lead singer Bobby Kimball spent the early part of 1983 facing prosecution for drug-related charges. Kimball was ordered to stand trial, but pled not guilty. The charges were dismissed on May 28 of that year. However, Kimball was fired from the band in 1984 due to difficulty recording vocals and numerous missed sessions. Later that year, Toto composed most of the music for the soundtrack to the film Dune.

At one point, Richard Page of the band Mr. Mister was offered the lead singer spot, but turned it down to continue with his band. Fergie Frederiksen (formerly of bands Angel, Trillion and LeRoux) was brought in as the new vocalist and the band recorded Isolation, released in November 1984. While Isolation did not achieve the acclaim or sales of Toto IV, it did achieve Gold status, largely on the strength of the single "Stranger in Town". Isolations tour began in February 1985 and concluded three months later.

1985–1988: Fahrenheit and The Seventh One with Joseph Williams

At the close of the Isolation tour in 1985, Fergie Frederiksen was let go. Lukather claimed that the band was not meshing well with Frederiksen because he had a difficult time recording with them in the studio. The band held an audition and Joseph Williams, son of film composer John Williams and 1950s singer/actress Barbara Ruick, was chosen to take over lead vocals in early 1986.

With Joseph Williams now onboard officially, Toto wrote and recorded Fahrenheit, released in October 1986. While Williams performs lead vocals, Frederiksen had begun recording a few tracks and is featured as a background vocalist on the track "Could This Be Love".

Fahrenheit brought the band back from the heavier sound of Isolation to their pop/rock roots. "I'll Be Over You" and "Without Your Love", which were both ballads sung by Lukather, were the two hit singles. The band recruited several guest musicians for the album. They recorded an instrumental piece entitled "Don't Stop Me Now" with legendary jazz trumpeter Miles Davis. In addition, a then-unknown Paula Abdul appeared as a dancer in their "Till the End" music video. Michael McDonald provided backup vocals on the song "I'll Be Over You" (and appeared in the accompanying music video), while Eagles founder and songwriting giant Don Henley appeared on the Steve Porcaro penned track "Lea".

After its release, the band embarked on another world tour. Upon its conclusion in 1987, Steve Porcaro left the band to pursue a career in film and television scoring. Fahrenheit eventually went Gold on October 3, 1994. Steve Porcaro was never replaced and Toto decided to continue with only five members. Although Porcaro occasionally assisted the band on synthesizers for their subsequent studio albums (and appeared on their 1988 tour), David Paich handled most of the live keyboard work (with keyboard technician John Jessel assisting on certain dates) post 1988.

In 1988 Toto released their next album The Seventh One, featuring Jon Anderson of Yes on backup vocals on the single "Stop Loving You". The album's other single, "Pamela", became very popular and would be the band's last to hit the US Top 40. The Seventh One became the band's most successful release since Toto IV. The band toured from February through July 1988.

1988–1990: Past to Present and Jean-Michel Byron

Although "The Seventh One Tour" was very successful, after it was finished the band decided to replace lead singer Joseph Williams. Originally, the band wanted to reunite with original vocalist Bobby Kimball to record new songs for a greatest hits record, but the record company instead insisted they hire South African singer Jean-Michel Byron. Before Byron was brought in, the band recorded "Goin' Home" with Kimball. This song was later featured on the Toto XX album as an "unreleased song". When Byron was brought in (in 1989) he and Toto recorded four new songs which were included on their greatest hits album Past to Present 1977–1990, released in 1990. Toto then embarked upon the "Planet Earth" tour that lasted from September until December 1990. The band didn't get along with Byron, whose diva-like behavior and flamboyant stage presence caused friction during the tour. He was demoted to background vocals before ultimately being fired at the conclusion of the tour. During this time, the band also found that former singer Bobby Kimball was booking shows and billing himself and his backing band as "Toto". In April, mirroring the situation that had happened with Kimball seven years previously, former singer Joseph Williams was arrested on drug-related charges.

Lukather's first solo album was released in 1989, named Lukather, and featured musicians such as Eddie Van Halen and Richard Marx.

1991–1992: Kingdom of Desire and Jeff Porcaro's death
Once again without a lead vocalist, guitarist Steve Lukather sang lead vocals and became the new front man. Toto played at the Montreux Jazz Festival in 1991 and the band recorded Kingdom of Desire, which was released on Columbia Records in most parts of the world and on Clive Davis' label Relativity Records in the United States.

Jeff Porcaro died in an accident on August 5, 1992, at the age of 38 while working in his garden. According to the Los Angeles Times Report, the Los Angeles County Coroner's office lists the cause of death to be a heart attack from the hardening of the arteries caused by cocaine use. Facing the prospect of a tour without Jeff, Toto almost broke up. However, Jeff Porcaro's family insisted the band continue. The band contacted Los Angeles-based Englishman Simon Phillips to replace Jeff Porcaro as they knew that Porcaro liked Phillips alongside Vinnie Colaiuta and Gregg Bissonette and because Lukather worked with Phillips on a previous tour with Santana and Jeff Beck in Japan in 1986.

Phillips joined the band and they went on the tour, which they dedicated to Jeff's memory. In 1993 they released a live album called Absolutely Live. From 1991 on, Steve Lukather would handle a majority of the vocals (until Bobby Kimball's return in 1998), but some older songs originally sung by Kimball, Fergie Frederiksen, and Joseph Williams were put in the set list and sung by new backup singers Fred White (who was replaced by John James in 1992), Jackie McGee (who had joined for the 1990 tour and was replaced by Donna McDaniel in 1992), and Jenny Douglas-McRae (who had also come aboard in 1990). Douglas-McRae formerly served as an actress as the librarian in the band's 1982 "Africa" music video. James sang "Stop Loving You" and Kimball's part on "Rosanna", McDaniel sang "Home of the Brave" and "Angel Don't Cry", and Douglas-McRae sang "Hold the Line".

On December 14, 1992, the Tribute to Jeff Porcaro Concert was held at Universal City's Universal Amphitheatre. Performers including Don Henley, Eddie Van Halen, Donald Fagen, Walter Becker, Boz Scaggs, James Newton Howard, Michael McDonald, David Crosby and special guest George Harrison performed various Toto songs along with the four remaining Toto members. At the close of the tour, the band then took a break to pursue individual projects as well as to keep up their session schedules.

From March to November 1993, Lukather and Phillips teamed up with friends David Garfield and John Pena on the side project Los Lobotomys and recorded the album Candyman.

1995–1997: Addition of Simon Phillips and Tambu
In 1995 Toto recorded Tambu, their first album with Simon Phillips, which saw the band back with CBS (now Sony). A departure from Toto's sound of the late 1970s and 1980s, Tambu was a very organic release and featured the single "I Will Remember", which received moderate radio play. Other singles released were "Drag Him To The Roof" and "The Turning Point". Tambu also featured John James and Jenny Douglas-McRae as backup singers on some of the tracks. Douglas-McRae even sang lead on the album's bonus track, "Blackeye", and also in a duet with Steve Lukather on "Baby He's Your Man". Tambu sold 600,000 copies worldwide.

The "Tambu Tour" proved to be another success, although there were no North American dates. Simon Phillips suffered from a back problem, so Gregg Bissonette had to fill in for him during the first leg of the tour in late 1995. The tour concluded in 1996. The rest of the tour personnel remained the same, with the exception of Donna McDaniel who had left in 1994 shortly after the "Night of the Proms" performances (which Douglas-McRae had missed since she was out touring with Joe Cocker). The song "Hold the Line" was now sung as a duet between James and Douglas-McRae.
Both James and Douglas-McRae were dropped from the band at the conclusion of the 1997 tour.

Lukather released his second solo album, Luke, which was a more "introspective" album than his previous solo album.

1997–2001: Toto XX, Bobby Kimball's return and Mindfields
1997 marked the band's 20th anniversary, and in order to commemorate it, David Paich and Steve Lukather started to go through several old tapes and demos for a special record of unreleased songs. In 1998 they released Toto XX with the single "Goin' Home". Toto went on a small promotional tour with former members Bobby Kimball, Steve Porcaro and Joseph Williams.

After the "Toto XX" tour, Bobby Kimball rejoined the band as lead singer after 14 years. The band released Mindfields in early 1999 and embarked on the "Reunion" tour, touring worldwide and returning to the United States for the first time in six years. The new album featured three singles, "Melanie", "Cruel" and "Mad About You", a song co-written by David Paich and former Toto vocalist Joseph Williams. Later that year, a live album titled Livefields was released. The tour officially concluded in 2000, but the band played a few shows throughout 2001. David Paich briefly took a break from touring in 2000, so Jeff Babko filled in on keyboards. Paich then resumed touring with Toto in 2001.

2002–2003: Through the Looking Glass and Toto's 25th anniversary
In 2002, in celebration of Toto's 25th anniversary, the band released Through the Looking Glass, a covers album that paid tribute to the band's musical influences, such as Bob Marley, Steely Dan, The Beatles, and Elton John. Two singles were released: "Could You Be Loved", a Bob Marley cover, and "While My Guitar Gently Weeps", a Beatles cover. The album was not a commercial success and many fans were upset about the release, thinking that the band should have written new material instead. However, the record gave the band material to promote their "25th Anniversary Tour", which started in 2002 and concluded in 2003. After the tour, Toto released a live album and DVD of the show titled Live in Amsterdam. Both the live album and the DVD were released in late 2003.

2003–2005: Greg Phillinganes joins and David Paich's semi-retirement

Beginning in June 2003, near the end of their "25th Anniversary Tour", keyboardist David Paich took a leave of absence from touring to spend time with a sick family member. Veteran keyboardist Greg Phillinganes filled in for Paich for the rest of the tour.

In late 2003, Toto headlined Night of the Proms for two months straight. Paich returned but was only able to play for a few weeks before he had to leave again, so Phillinganes once again filled in for the remainder of the shows. After Simon Phillips announced of illness, Jon Fariss and Ricky Lawson joined the band for the Night of the Proms. In early 2004, the band embarked on a world tour that went throughout 2004 and 2005. Paich only occasionally appeared, with Phillinganes playing at most of the shows. In 2005, Phillinganes was asked to become a regular member of the band and Paich retired from touring. Paich was still a member of Toto, however, as he continued to record and produce on all of Toto's releases.

In October 2003, Steve Lukather released a Christmas album named Santamental, featuring musicians such as Eddie Van Halen, Slash, Steve Vai, and Gregg Bissonette.

2006–2008: Falling in Between and the subsequent tour and live album

In early 2006, Toto released Falling in Between on the Italian label Frontiers, their first album of new material since 1999. The release featured extensive keyboard work from Steve Porcaro and a duet with Joseph Williams on the first single, "Bottom of Your Soul". Following the record's release, Toto embarked on an extensive worldwide tour in 2006, which continued into 2007 for a second leg. The 2007 leg featured Leland Sklar filling in on bass for Mike Porcaro due to an (at the time) undisclosed illness. Mike Porcaro's last show with the band would be on November 16, 2006, in Medina, Minnesota. The 2007 leg also featured extensive dates in both Europe and the United States, including an appearance at Moondance Jam in Walker, Minnesota. Former lead singer Fergie Frederiksen made a guest appearance at the Minneapolis date on May 5, 2007 and Joseph Williams also made a few guest appearances with the band in June 2007. The tour continued into 2008 and began in Mexico City, Mexico on January 31, 2008. They would tour Japan with Boz Scaggs, which additionally featured Joseph Williams singing lead and background vocals with Kimball, and also featured the return of David Paich.

Toto released a two-CD set Falling in Between Live on Eagle Records to commemorate the tour. This live set marked the fourth for the band, following 1993's Absolutely Live, 1999's Livefields, and 2003's Live In Amsterdam.

In 2008, a companion DVD of the show which was recorded on March 26, 2007, at Le Zenith in Paris was released.

2008-2010: First hiatus and subsequent reformation
On June 5, 2008 after a period of rumors and some allusions, Lukather posted a message on his official website, stating, "The fact is yes I have left Toto. There is no more Toto. I just can't do it anymore and at 50 years old I wanted to start over and give it one last try on my own."

As the main motivation for his decision, Lukather said: When Dave [Paich] retired that was REAL hard for me 'cause we started the band together. Hell, it's 35 years if you count High School where the core all met. When Mike [Porcaro] fell ill and had to leave that was it for me. If there isn't Paich or at least one Porcaro how can we even call it Toto? ... Honestly, I have just had enough. This is NOT a break. It is over. I really can't go out and play Hold The Line with a straight face anymore.Steve Lukather released his next solo album on February 22, 2008, titled Ever Changing Times.

On February 26, 2010, the band reformed and reunited for a brief tour of Europe in the summer to benefit Mike Porcaro, who had been diagnosed with ALS. The lineup featured David Paich, Steve Lukather, Steve Porcaro, Simon Phillips, Joseph Williams, and special guest Nathan East.

Steve Lukather stated that the band still existed: 

On October 11, 2010, Steve Lukather released his next solo album, All's Well That Ends Well.

Another tour in the summer of 2011 took place with former backup singer Jenny Douglas once again joining. Their show on July 17, 2011, in Verona, Italy was recorded for a live DVD but has yet to be released because of a contractual issue with their former label. They once again toured Europe in 2012.

2013–2014: 35th anniversary and Simon Phillips's departure
In 2013, celebrating their 35th anniversary, the band embarked on tour across Europe and North America, along with Japanese dates to follow in 2014. Their show on June 25, 2013, in Łódź, Poland was recorded for a live release and was released on April 29, 2014. On November 5, it was confirmed both on Toto's and David Paich's official Facebook pages that a new studio album was in the works and that the band planned to go into the studio early 2014.

On January 21, 2013, Steve Lukather released a solo album, Transition, featuring former Toto touring bassist Leland Sklar, as well as Gregg Bissonette and Chad Smith.

On January 18, 2014, former vocalist Fergie Frederiksen died after a long battle with liver cancer. After the 2013 leg of the 35th anniversary tour, it was revealed via the band's official website on January 23, 2014, that Simon Phillips had departed the band to pursue a solo career. Phillips was then replaced by Steely Dan drummer Keith Carlock.

2014: David Hungate's return and North American tour with Michael McDonald
While Keith Carlock was now part of the band, he did not join them for at least the North American tour and his role was filled by Shannon Forrest. Bass player Nathan East, who had been touring with them since 2010, left after the Japanese tour to pursue his own projects. Instead, original bass player David Hungate rejoined the band. They once again toured the United States in spring 2014 as co-headliners with Michael McDonald. It was their most comprehensive tour on the continent in years.

2015–2017: Toto XIV and Mike Porcaro's death
Toto released their fourteenth studio album and their first in nine years titled Toto XIV on March 20 (Europe), March 23 (UK and Oceania), and March 24, 2015 (North America). To promote the newly finished project, the band started a world tour running with an extensive European headline arena tour including appearances at key festivals, along with a North American tour to follow in the summer of 2015 and Asia later that year.

On March 15, 2015, former bassist Mike Porcaro died in his sleep at his home in Los Angeles, due to complications from his battle with ALS.

On April 6, 2015, Toto announced that they would embark on August 7, 2015, in Mashantucket, Connecticut, with the band Yes, on a joint summer tour of North America, due to end on September 12 in Coquitlam, British Columbia. Dave Santos took over bass from Dave Hungate for the final three dates of the tour and Shannon Forrest continued to perform as the band's drummer.

On September 29, 2015, Toto announced the first leg of their 2016 Tour in support of Toto XIV consisting of European and Japanese dates. Leland Sklar, who joined them on their 2007 and 2008 tours, replaced founding member Hungate. Sklar stopped touring with Toto in early 2017 and was replaced by Shem von Schroeck.

In June 2016, keyboardist Steve Porcaro released his first solo album, titled Someday/Somehow featuring Michael McDonald and Toto touring backing singer Mabvuto Carpenter.

2018–2019: 40th anniversary albums, Old Is New, and second hiatus
On February 9, 2018, Toto released their anniversary album 40 Trips Around the Sun. They then embarked on a world tour promoting the album and celebrating 40 years of music. The band's lineup consisted of Joseph Williams, Steve Lukather, David Paich, and Steve Porcaro, and their touring musicians: Lenny Castro, Shannon Forrest, Warren Ham, and Shem von Schroeck.

On July 20, 2018, Toto announced: "David Paich will not be performing on the band's planned North American tour. He plans on focusing on his health and looks forward to returning to the road when ready to do so. In the absence of the founding keyboardist's presence on the tour, Dominique 'Xavier' Taplin (formerly with Prince) will be sitting in for David performing with Toto."

After the European leg of the tour, Toto covered Weezer's song "Hash Pipe" in response to their cover of Toto's 1981 number 1 single, "Africa". The band added the cover to their setlist as the encore for the 2018 North American leg of the tour.

On September 18, 2018, guitarist Steve Lukather released his autobiography The Gospel According to Luke, a humorous review on his life in music. An Audiobook was released shortly after on Audible.

On November 6, 2018, the band released the box set All In which contained their fourteenth studio album Old Is New. This contained the three new tracks already released on 40 Trips Around the Sun plus completed recordings of four other older tracks featuring Jeff Porcaro on drums and either Mike Porcaro or David Hungate on bass plus other new recordings.

On January 2, 2019, Toto kicked off their 2019 leg of the 40 Trips Around The Sun tour in Byron Bay at the Falls Festival. Xavier Taplin remained in place of Paich through that tour. Toto embarked upon a brief tour of North America on September 20, 2019. Steve Lukather stated that the tour would be the band's last for "a while", and that tensions within the band and its management had increased due to legal troubles, such as an ongoing lawsuit with the widow of founding member and drummer Jeff Porcaro, Susan Porcaro-Goings (current wife of Rick Goings). David Paich made a special appearance with the group at the tour opener in Los Angeles, singing and playing on “Africa” and “Home of the Brave”.

On October 16, 2019, Steve Lukather stated that after the final show in Philadelphia on October 20, 2019, it would mark the "end of this configuration of Toto". Steve Lukather had also announced that there is a film about Toto in the works, and hinted that he would be writing a new book, titled The New Testament According to Luke. David Paich made another special appearance at the final show in Philadelphia to again perform "Africa" and "Home of the Brave".

2020–present: Second reformation and Dogz of Oz Tour
On October 19, 2020, it was announced that Steve Lukather and Joseph Williams would return to touring under the band name, in a proposed worldwide tour in 2021, known as the Dogz of Oz Tour. The new band lineup would feature bassist John Pierce (Huey Lewis and the News, Pablo Cruise, and a long-time session player), drummer Robert "Sput" Searight (Ghost-Note, Snarky Puppy), and keyboardists Dominique "Xavier" Taplin (Prince, Ghost-Note) and Steve Maggiora (Robert Jon & the Wreck), as well as multi-instrumentalist Warren Ham. The tour began with a soft-opening: a worldwide live-streamed performance on November 21, 2020, during which David Paich appeared with the band for the final two songs. On April 12, 2021, the band announced that the Dogz of Oz World Tour would be pushed to 2022.

On April 14, 2021, the band announced that they would release a new live album, With a Little Help from My Friends, through Mascot Label Group/The Players Club. Released on June 25, the album contains the streamed performance of November 2020, and was preceded by the release of two singles, live renditions of "Til The End" and "You Are The Flower". On June 28, 2021, Lukather stated that the group has no plans to record any future studio albums, though he was open to working with Williams on solo projects.

Toto began 2022 with a 40-city tour through major U.S. basketball and hockey arenas, serving as the opening act for Journey. David Paich joined Toto for the final four songs (Home of the Brave, With a Little Help From My Friends, Rosanna and Africa) in several shows. He also joined the band for the European leg of the tour at the Amsterdam show on July 15, 2022. On August 16, 2022, Greg Phillinganes returned to the Toto lineup for the first time since the Falling In Between tour in 2008, filling in for regular touring keyboardist, Dominique “Xavier” Taplin, who was forced to return home shortly before the end of the European leg of the tour, citing family reasons. Phillinganes' brief stay with the band was only temporary though, as Taplin returned to the band on August 23, 2022 for their show in Luxembourg.

Session work (1970s to early 1990s)
Before, and during Toto, the members did various session work for a slew of notable musicians. The first such session, which also led to the birth of the band was with Boz Scaggs, in which Jeff Porcaro, David Paich, David Hungate, and Joe Porcaro (regular Toto guest contributor and father of Jeff, Steve, and Mike) played on his smash hit album Silk Degrees. The members had done smaller scale work before this album working with the likes of Steely Dan, Seals and Crofts, and Sonny & Cher. Steve Lukather provided the main guitar work on Michael Jackson's hit "Beat It", although Eddie Van Halen played the guitar solo in the bridge. Jeff Porcaro played drums on the track, while Steve Porcaro programmed synthesizer for the Thriller album and also wrote and composed "Human Nature".

In 1982, the rock band Chicago brought in David Foster to produce their album Chicago 16. They had considered using him for their 1980 album Chicago XIV, but went with Tom Dowd instead. Under Foster's direction, the band adopted more of a soft rock sound, shed most of its jazz fusion/horn section sound, and brought in many session musicians. Of the musicians chosen, three were Steve Lukather, David Paich, and Steve Porcaro, the three core members of Toto.

In 1978, under David Foster's direction, he brought in David Hungate, Steve Lukather, Steve Porcaro, and Toto vocalist Bobby Kimball to play on Alice Cooper's 1978 album From the Inside. They have also played with legendary jazz player Miles Davis. Other artists/bands whom the members of Toto have collaborated with include Larry Carlton, Pink Floyd, Quincy Jones, Eric Clapton, Paul McCartney, James Newton-Howard, Michael McDonald, the Eagles, Earth, Wind & Fire, Yes, Eddie Van Halen, Los Lobotomys, Yoso, Richard Page (of Mr. Mister, who was proposed to replace Bobby Kimball), and Ringo Starr & His All-Starr Band (also featuring Richard Page).

Band membersCurrent members Steve Lukather – lead guitar, lead and backing vocals, bass guitar 
 David Paich – keyboards, lead and backing vocals 
 Joseph Williams – lead and backing vocals, additional keyboards Former members Jeff Porcaro – drums, percussion 
 Steve Porcaro – keyboards, occasional backing and lead vocals 
 David Hungate – bass, guitar 
 Bobby Kimball – lead and backing vocals 
 Mike Porcaro – bass, occasional backing vocals 
 Fergie Frederiksen – lead and backing vocals 
 Jean-Michel Byron – lead and backing vocals 
 Simon Phillips – drums, percussion 
 Greg Phillinganes – keyboards, lead and backing vocals 
 Keith Carlock – drums, percussion, occasional backing vocals 

DiscographyStudio albums Toto (1978)
 Hydra (1979)
 Turn Back (1981)
 Toto IV (1982)
 Isolation (1984)
 Fahrenheit (1986)
 The Seventh One (1988)
 Kingdom of Desire (1992)
 Tambu (1995)
 Mindfields (1999)
 Through the Looking Glass (2002)
 Falling in Between (2006)
 Toto XIV (2015)
 Old Is New (2018)Soundtrack albums'''
 Dune (1984)

Awards and nominations
Grammy Awards

|-
|  || rowspan="2"| Toto || Best New Artist || 
|-
| rowspan="8"|  || Producer of the Year || 
|-
| rowspan="5"| "Rosanna" || Record of the Year || 
|-
| Song of the Year || 
|-
| Best Pop Vocal Performance by a Duo or Group || 
|-
| Best Vocal Arrangement for Two or More Voices || 
|-
| Best Instrumental Arrangement Accompanying Vocal(s) || 
|-
| rowspan="2"| Toto IV || Album of the Year || 
|-
| rowspan="3"| Best Engineered Recording, Non-Classical || 
|-
|  || Tambu || 
|-
|  || Mindfields'' || 

Other awards
In 1986 Toto won a Crystal Globe award, signifying sales of more than 5 million records outside of their home country.

Tours

 1979 – Toto Tour
 1980 – Hydra Tour
 1982 – Toto IV Tour
 1985–1986 – Isolation Tour
 1986–1987 – Fahrenheit Tour
 1988 – The Seventh One Tour
 1990 – Planet Earth Tour (Past to Present Tour)
 1991 – 1991 Summer Tour
 1992–1993 – Kingdom of Desire Tour
 1993 – 1993 Summer Tour
 1995–1996 – Tambu Tour
 1997 – South African Tour
 1998 – Toto XX Tour
 1999–2000 – Mindfields Tour
 2001–2002 – 2001 Summer Tour
 2002–2004 – 25th Anniversary Tour (Through the Looking Glass Tour)
 2004–2005 – 2004 Summer Tour
 2006–2008 – Falling in Between Tour
 2010 – Mike Porcaro Honor Tour
 2011 – In the Blink of an Eye Tour
 2012 – 2012 Summer Tour
 2013–2014 – 35th Anniversary Tour
 2015–2016 – Toto XIV Tour (Yes & Toto Co-Headlining North American Summer Tour 2015) 
 2017 – An Evening With Toto Tour
 2018–2019 – 40 Trips Around the Sun Tour (40th Anniversary Tour) 
 2021-2023 – Dogz of Oz Tour (2022/3 selected dates with Journey)

References

External links

 
 Toto at WorldMusicDatabase

 
1977 establishments in California
American pop rock music groups
American soft rock music groups
American supergroups
Grammy Award winners
Hard rock musical groups from California
Musical groups disestablished in 2008
Musical groups disestablished in 2019
Musical groups established in 1977
Musical groups from Los Angeles
Musical groups reestablished in 2010
Progressive rock musical groups from California
Sibling musical groups
Musical groups reestablished in 2020